The Via Claudia Nova was an ancient Roman road, built in 47 AD by the Roman emperor Claudius to connect the Via Caecilia with the Via Claudia Valeria in central Italy.

There is no precise information about the road's route: according to some sources, it started from Amiternum, while for others it began at Civitatomassa, currently a frazione of Scoppito. It joined the Via Claudia Valeria  near Popoli, at the confluence of the Tirino and Aterno rivers. It passed, among the others, through the ancient cities of Peltuinum, and Ocriticum, where a temple dedicated to Jupiter existed.

References

Sources

Roman roads in Italy
1st-century establishments in Italy
40s establishments in the Roman Empire
Claudius
47 establishments